Ricardo Mazacotte (born 9 January 1985) is an Argentine-Paraguayan former professional footballer who played as a right-back.

References

External links
 
 
 

Living people
1985 births
Association football fullbacks
Argentine footballers
Argentine expatriate footballers
Paraguayan footballers
Paraguay international footballers
Club Nacional footballers
Sportivo Iteño footballers
12 de Octubre Football Club players
Unión de Santa Fe footballers
Club Olimpia footballers
Club Atlético 3 de Febrero players
Club Sol de América footballers
Deportivo Laferrere footballers
Expatriate footballers in Paraguay
Argentine people of Italian descent
People from Formosa, Argentina